Kejsi Tola (born 3 May 1992) is an Albanian singer and songwriter. She represented Albania at the Eurovision Song Contest 2009 in Moscow, Russia, after winning the 47th edition of Festivali i Këngës.

Life and career 

Kejsi Tola was born on 3 May 1992 into an Albanian family in the city of Vlorë, Albania. Tola began performing at an early age of 11 years old in the talent show "Young Voices of Albania", winning the first prize, and two-time winner of the Young Voices of Shkodra. In the first competition of Gjeniu i Vogël she was one of the ten finalists. Her music career had a jump on 2008, where she won the first prize on the 4th Edition of the talent show Ethet. Tola continued her path by being selected as the winner of the 2008 edition of Festivali i Këngës with the song "Më merr në ëndërr", which enabled her to represent Albania at the Eurovision Song Contest 2009, as the youngest performer.

Tola continued her musical studies at Jordan Misja Artistic Lyceum, later earning her master's degree as a soprano at the Academy of Arts in Tirana. She continued her music career through some successful and award-winning songs produced by some of the most successful producers; "Me Jeto", "Perendeshe e Fantazise" and "Iceberg". For the past year, Tola has released two new singles "U Rritëm" and "Më ke mua".

Tola represented Albania at the Eurovision Song Contest 2009 in Moscow, after winning Festivali i Këngës on 21 December. She finished seventeenth place with 48 points. Her song for the competition was called Carry Me in Your Dreams. Tola's entry has been submitted by Edmond Zhulali who was responsible for the nations very first Eurovision entry The Image of You in Eurovision Song Contest 2004 performed by Anjeza Shahini.
 
Tola attempted to enter the Eurovision Song Contest again in 2010, for the second consecutive time, by participating in Festivali i Këngës 2009 on 27 December 2009. But she placed just 15th with her ballad "Ndonjëherë". where she was a finalist and was awarded the First Magic Award.

Tola attempted once more to represent Albania for the Eurovision Song Contest 2011 in Düsseldorf, Germany. However, her mid-tempo song "Pranë" where she was a finalist and was awarded the Best Vocal Award. In 2012, she attempted to enter the Eurovision Song Contest for third time. Her song is called "Atje" and finished 4th with 42 points. After trying to enter the Eurovision Song Contest again, in 2014, Tola took part in Kënga Magjike with the song "Iceberg" being awarded the Best Production Award. Four years later, she entered the same competition Kënga Magjike with the song "Me ke mua", written, composed and arranged by Flori Mumajesi, where she received the Best Production Award. This song was also nominated at the best song of the year in 2019 Kult Awards.

Discography

Singles 

 "Një Minutë" (2008)
 "Carry Me in Your Dreams" (2008)
 "Qiellin do ta Prek me Ty" (2009)
 "UAT" (2009)
 "Ndonjëherë" (2009)
 "Pranë" (2010)
 "Më Jeto" (2011)
 "Atje" (2012)
 "Perëndeshë e Fantazisë" (2012)
 "S'jemi më atje" (2012)
 "Iceberg" (2014)
 "U rritëm" (2018)
 "Më ke mua" (2018)

Awards 

Kënga Magjike

|-
||2009
||"Qiellin Do Ta Prek Me Ty"
|The First Magic
|
|-
||2011
||"Me Jeto"
|Best Vocal
|
|-
||2012
||"Perendeshe e Fantazise"
|AMC Fun Page Prize
|
|-
||2014
||"Iceberg"
|Best Production
|
|}

Kult Awards

|-
||2015
||"Iceberg"
|Song of the Year
|
|}

Young Voices of Albania

|-
||2003
||"Herself"
|First Prize
|
|}

Young Voices of Shkodra

|-
||2003
||"Herself"
|First Prize
|
|-
||2004
||"Herself"
|First Prize
|
|}

References 

1992 births
Living people
Musicians from Tirana
People from Vlorë
21st-century Albanian  women singers
Festivali i Këngës winners
Eurovision Song Contest entrants for Albania
Eurovision Song Contest entrants of 2009